Bede's School consists of a preparatory school and pre-preparatory nursery in Holywell, Meads, Eastbourne, East Sussex, England, as well as a senior school based in Upper Dicker, Hailsham, East Sussex, England. These, along with the Legat School of Dance, form the Bede's School Trust, an educational charity. All three schools are independent and fee-charging. While the schools are on holiday, their sites form part of Bede's Summer School for exchange students.

Until 2012, the schools were known as St Bede's.

History
The Prep School was founded in 1895 by Frances Browne, at her house in Blackwater Road, Eastbourne, as Eastbourne College Prep School. It opened with four boys and D Burdett was appointed headmaster.

In 1900 the school was acquired by G Gowring who purchased a site in Dukes Drive and, at a cost of £7,000 built what is still the school's home today.

At the time of the Second World War, St Bede's was owned by and Kenneth Harding and his wife. During the war pupils were evacuated to St Edward's, Oxford, whilst the building itself was used for the essential wartime training of about 2,000 telegraphists who specialised in enemy code and cipher. St Bede's boys moved back to Eastbourne on VE Day, 8 May 1945.

Hugh Candlin was headmaster from 1946 to 1964 following the retirement of Ken Harding in 1946.

In 1964 Peter Pyemont and his wife took over the school and four years later it accepted its first girl pupil.

In 1971 it was formed into a charitable trust, administered by a board of governors.

In 1978 a country estate, eight miles to the north of Eastbourne, was purchased, and St Bede's Senior School opened its doors in the village of Upper Dicker to just over 30 students.

St Bede's Senior School grew out of St Bede's Preparatory School as an opportunity for pupils to enjoy the same educational  philosophy throughout their school careers, the Senior school was introduced.

The estate that was purchased, known to some as The Dicker, was the former of the Edwardian MP, financier and fraudster, Horatio Bottomley.

One of the most prominent houses in the village was the home of Bottomley's stud manager, known as Stud House. That building still exists today, as the Sixth Form Centre and Café. This was only a recent change, as before the changes of Easter 2012 and the recent development of new boarding houses, this used to be 'Stud House', but have now been located adjacent to the 'Multi Purpose Hall'.

As of September 2012, St Bede's Senior School, Prep School and Pre-Prep and Nursery dropped the 'St.' from their titles.

Prep School
Bede's Prep School is situated on the South Downs, next to the Helen Gardens in Eastbourne.

The Prep School was founded in 1895 with a roll of four boys. In 1902, it moved from its site in Blackwater Road to larger premises in the Meads area of Eastbourne, at Dukes Drive.

The school is now over 100 years old, and much has changed.

In 2009, new dining rooms, the conversion of Holywell Mount to a nursery, and new classrooms were built, and there is now a roll of around 400 pupils.

Through Bede's Pre-Prep and Nursery, the trust now educates children from infancy up to Common Entrance exams at Year 8.

Its current headmaster is Mark Hammond, who was appointed in 2020.

It has a number of notable alumni, including Eddie Izzard and Nicky Henson.

The school is also famous for its John Bodkin Adams' connection, a doctor believed to have tricked patients into adding him into their will before poisoning them. The headmaster, Vaughan Tomlinson died on 14 November 1950. His widow, Gertrude, having remarried and now Gertrude Hullett, died soon after this in mysterious circumstances on 23 July 1956. Her death led to an investigation into her doctor, John Bodkin Adams. He was tried at the Old Bailey in 1957 on two counts of murder and controversially found not guilty. Home Office pathologist Francis Camps identified 163 cases where Adams' patients died in suspicious circumstances.

Senior School
Bede's Senior School is a secondary, co-educational boarding school with five boarding houses and five day houses, in the village of Upper Dicker, near Hailsham, with a total of 750 pupils and 223 staff, not including grounds or catering staff, working across the site giving a student to teacher ratio of just over three to one.

The first appointed headmaster was R. Perrin.

The current headmaster is Peter Goodyer, who joined the school in 2016.

Bede's Senior School offers academic scholarships based on the school's own tests, interview and reference, as well as in areas such as music, art, drama and sports.

At GCSE there are over 60 subjects on offer. In the sixth form there are over 30 courses which may be A-Level, BTEC, National Diploma or Cambridge Pre-U.

The co-curricular activities programme provides over 120 choices for three days each week.

School councils
A school council exists of students from each year group, to discuss ideas and plans for the school. At the Senior School, each day house, and boarding house, has its own house council, run by the head girl or boy of that house. The head of house, and another elected member of the house, then take ideas and suggestions to the senior school council, which is chaired by the head of school.

Facilities

At the Prep School, much renovation has gone on over the years since the initial purchase of the building years ago. Holywell House, which was formerly used for Year 8 and senior years, has now been completely rebuilt into a state-of-the-art nursery for infants. The Prep's senior years have moved into brand new classrooms, built on top of the new dining room, using the area which had situated the dilapidated year 1 and 2 classrooms. This is now known as Holywell Mount, or simply, Holywell. The Prep School also boasts new science labs which were built in 2007, with plenty of equipment such as gas taps and electrical points for experiments. The area which had been taken up by the old dining room has also been converted into cookery rooms and a bigger dance studio.

At the Senior School the facilities have been expanded enormously from the temporary classrooms built at the school's creation. Which are slowly being replaced in the future.

New boarding houses have been built with common rooms and bedrooms that are arranged in ‘flats’ ranging from singles and doubles to ‘fours’ for the younger students. Drama performances take place in the Miles Studio, which opened in 2006 by comedian Ronnie Corbett, which also houses the Legat School of Dance. The Multi Purpose Hall (MPH), opened in 2007, ensures that sport can take place whatever the weather and boasts indoor cricket nets, netball courts and badminton courts.  At other times it is transformed into a concert hall for audiences of up to a thousand. It is also used regularly for school assemblies, remembrance day services, and the Inter house music competition.

Inside the MPH, the indoor swimming pool is of championship size, along with a fitness centre and four squash courts. Music performances also take place in the Multi Purpose Hall, in the school's Recital Room and often outside in the Park, with the annual 'Bede's Fest' rock and pop music festival, as well as Cabaret, a bi-annual formal dinner, taking place here.

The school has its own zoo that maintains over 60 species of animals. These range from mammals including monkeys, lemurs, a binturong and marmosets to various birds, reptiles and fish. An extension to the school was completed in 2018.

Elsewhere within the grounds, there is a golf course, football, rugby and cricket pitches, an all-weather Astro that is used for hockey throughout the year, tennis courts, and a cricket oval including the 'M-J Pavilion' built in honour of alumnus and cricket commentator Christopher Martin-Jenkins.

Houses
At the Prep School, all students, both girls and boys, and boarders and day pupils, are randomly split into the houses Eagle, Falcon, Hawk and Raven, unlike at the Senior School where girls houses are separate to boys, and boarders are separate to day students houses.

Bede's Prep School's house system is based around section points, and houses battle it out in sports, academic quizzes and music events such as the Interhouse Music Competition to become the house with the most points at the end of the year. Children are also given badges for points they have earned themselves. There are badges of 30, 50 and 100 section points.

At St Bede's Senior School, houses play a much more important role, with physical buildings for each house rather than just a points system. Deis, Dicker and Knights are the day houses for boys. Charleston and Bloomsbury are the day houses for girls. For boarders, Camberlot, Dorms and Stud are for boys, and Dorter and Crossways for girls. These houses are the ‘homes’ within the school for the students. There is also a day boarding option, where a day student can enrol in a boarding house.

At St Bede's Senior School, boarding houses have a Housemaster and two House Tutors who live in the houses, matrons are on duty from 7 am to 10 pm. Each student has a Tutor who is a member of the academic staff and each Tutor will have up to eight Tutees. Tutor time is scheduled into the weekly timetable.

Former pupils
Alumni are known as Old Bedians.

St Bede's Senior School, Upper Dicker
 Rob Buchanan
 Earl Cave
 Dan Harding
 Shai Hope
 Jamie Lloyd
 Solomon March
 James Norwood
 Ollie Rayner
 Luke Wells
 Fynn Hudson-Prentice
 Alice Capsey

St Bede's Prep School, Eastbourne 
 Nicky Henson
 Eddie Izzard
 Sirichok Sopha
 Christopher Martin-Jenkins
 Peter Cook

References

External links
 

Preparatory schools in East Sussex
Private schools in East Sussex
Boarding schools in East Sussex
Educational institutions established in 1895
1895 establishments in England